Sandra van der Aa (born 28 June 1972) is a former professional tennis player from the Netherlands. On 16 November 1992, she reached her highest singles ranking of 263 by the Women's Tennis Association (WTA).

In 1993, her only WTA Tour main-draw appearance came at the Palermo Open, where she partnered with her countrywoman Seda Noorlander in the doubles event. They lost in the quarterfinals to the pair of the Dutch Ingelise Driehuis and the Mexican player Lupita Novelo.

ITF finals

Singles: 1 (0-1)

Doubles: 6 (2–4)

References

External links
 
 

1972 births
Living people
Dutch female tennis players
20th-century Dutch women
20th-century Dutch people
21st-century Dutch women